Abdullah Mahmoud al-Khalidi was a Syrian Armed Forces major general who has been described as "one of Syria's foremost experts in aviation". He was allegedly assassinated by the opposition on 30 October 2012 in the Rukn-Eddin neighborhood of Damascus, after leaving his car. Opposition activists denied this report and claimed that the Syrian government was behind the assassination because al-Khalidi planned to defect.

References

Year of birth missing
2012 deaths
Syrian generals
Military personnel killed in the Syrian civil war
Assassinated military personnel